Hibbertia hirsuta is a species of flowering plant in the family Dilleniaceae and is endemic to southern Australia. It is a small, slender, prostrate shrub with sparsely hairy foliage, narrow elliptic leaves and small yellow flowers with a single petal, usually only a single stamen and two carpels.

Description
The flowers are arranged singly in leaf axils and on the ends of short side shoots, and are sessile. There are two carpels, each with two ovules.

Taxonomy
This species was formally described in 1836 by William Jackson Hooker and was given the name Pleurandra hirsuta in the Companion to the Botanical Magazine from specimens collected by James Backhouse "near Hobart Town". In 1963, George Bentham changed the name to Hibbertia hirsuta in Flora Australiensis.

Distribution and habitat
Hibbertia hirsuta grows in grassland, woodland and heath, in northern Tasmania and south-eastern South Australia.

See also
List of Hibbertia species

References

hirsuta
Flora of South Australia
Flora of Tasmania
Taxa named by William Jackson Hooker
Plants described in 1836